Ira Edgar Rider (November 17, 1868 – May 29, 1906) was an American lawyer and politician who served one term as a U.S. Representative from New York from 1903 to 1905.

Biography 
Born in Jersey City, New Jersey, Rider attended the public schools and the College of the City of New York. He graduated from St. Lawrence University in Canton, New York. Rider studied law, was admitted to the bar and commenced practice in New York City. From 1898 to 1902, he served as secretary to Manhattan's borough president.

Congress 
Rider was elected as a Democrat to the Fifty-eighth Congress (March 4, 1903 – March 3, 1905). Owing to ill health, he was not a candidate for renomination in 1904.

Later career and death 
He resumed the practice of law and died in New York City, May 29, 1906. He was interred in Calvary Cemetery, Woodside, Queens, New York.

Sources

1868 births
1906 deaths
20th-century American politicians
Politicians from Jersey City, New Jersey
St. Lawrence University alumni
American Roman Catholics
Burials at Calvary Cemetery (Queens)
Democratic Party members of the United States House of Representatives from New York (state)
New York University alumni